Sir Henry Johnson (13 August 1661 – 29 September 1719) of The Gate House, Blackwall, Middlesex; Bradenham, Buckinghamshire; and Toddington, Bedfordshire was a British shipbuilder and a Member of Parliament for 30 years.

Early life
He was born the eldest son of Sir Henry Johnson, M.P., of Blackwall and Friston Hall, Suffolk by Mary Lord, the daughter and heiress of William Lord of Melton, Kent. Among his siblings were William Johnson and Martha Johnson (who married Hill Mussenden, MP for Harwich and brother to Carteret Leathes).

Career

Described as "the greatest shipbuilder and shipowner of his day, having at one time shares in 38 vessels" as well as owning considerable East India Company stock. Later, he had become a bitter opponent of the East India Company and was one of the leading members of the syndicate established in October 1691 to break its monopoly, likely as a result of a dispute with Sir Josiah Child, 1st Baronet.

Johnson succeeded his father in 1683 and was knighted in March 1685. He served as one of the two members of Parliament for Aldeburgh from 1689 to 1719, his younger brother William, who died in 1718, being the other member for all but a year of that time. Upon his death in 1719, he was succeeded as by Walter Plumer after a by-election.

He became an Elder Brother of Trinity House in 1700 and Master from 1707 to 1709.

Personal life
On 20 May 1686, Johnson married his first wife Anne Smithson, daughter and heiress of London haberdasher Hugh Smithson (third son of Sir Hugh Smithson, 1st Baronet). Before her death, they had one daughter:

 Anne Johnson (–1754), who married Thomas Wentworth, 1st Earl of Strafford, and had four children.

On 11 March 1693, he made an advantageous second marriage to Martha Lovelace, who became suo jure the 8th Baroness Wentworth in 1697, daughter and heiress of John Lovelace, 3rd Baron Lovelace and the former Martha Pye. The younger Martha was heiress to some of her father's property in Berkshire; through her grandmother Anne Lovelace, 7th Baroness Wentworth; to Water Eaton in Oxfordshire and Toddington in Bedfordshire and through her maternal grandfather Sir Edmund Pye, 1st Baronet to the Bradenham estate in Buckinghamshire.

Johnson died of gout at Bath on 29 September 1719 and was buried in the Wentworth vault at Toddington. He left his several estates to his granddaughters.

Descendants
Through his daughter Anne, he was a grandfather of four: William Wentworth, 2nd Earl of Strafford; Lady Anne Wentworth (wife of Irish statesman and landowner William James Conolly); Lady Lucy Wentworth (wife of Sir George Howard);
Lady Henrietta Wentworth (wife of Henry Vernon of Hilton and mother of Henrietta, Lady Grosvenor).

References 

1661 births
1719 deaths
Place of birth missing
People from Aldeburgh
English MPs 1689–1690
English MPs 1690–1695
English MPs 1695–1698
English MPs 1698–1700
English MPs 1701
English MPs 1701–1702
English MPs 1702–1705
English MPs 1705–1707
British MPs 1707–1708
British MPs 1708–1710
British MPs 1710–1713
British MPs 1713–1715
British MPs 1715–1722
Knights Bachelor
Members of the Parliament of Great Britain for English constituencies
British businesspeople in shipping
British shipbuilders
17th-century English businesspeople
18th-century English businesspeople
People from Toddington, Bedfordshire
People from Wycombe District